Wood (also known as Woods) is an unincorporated community in DeKalb County, in the U.S. state of Missouri.

The community is on Missouri Route H approximately 6.5 miles northwest of Maysville. Lost Creek flows past approximately one half mile east of the community.

History
A post office called Woods was established in 1898, and remained in operation until 1902. The community has the name of J. Wood, the original owner of the site.

References

Unincorporated communities in DeKalb County, Missouri
Unincorporated communities in Missouri